Elizabeth "Betsie" Verwoerd (née Schoombee; 17 May 1901 – 29 February 2000) was the spouse of the Prime Minister of South Africa from 2 September 1958 until the assassination of her husband Hendrik Verwoerd on 6 September 1966.

Betsie was of Danish descent and born on 17 May 1901 to Wynand Johannes Schoombee and Anna Francina Susanna Schoombee (née Naude) in Middelburg in the Cape Colony.

Betsie met her husband while they both attended Stellenbosch University in the early-1920s. They were married in Hamburg, Germany where Verwoerd was studying on 7 January 1927. The couple returned to South Africa in 1928. They had seven children - five sons (Wilhelm, Hendrik, Christian, Daniel and Wynand) and two daughters (Anna and Elsabeth). One of her daughters, Anna, married Carel Boshoff, who later founded the Afrikaner settlement of Orania.

Her husband was assassinated on 6 September 1966. Afterwards, she occasionally conducted some official duties such as opening the Hendrik Verwoerd Dam (later renamed Gariep Dam) in 1972.

In 1992, she moved to Orania, the Afrikaner settlement founded by her son-in-law. She was visited by the first Black President of South Africa, Nelson Mandela, at her home in 1995.

Betsie Verwoerd died at her home on 29 February 2000 at the age of 98. Nelson Mandela expressed his sadness at her death, stating he had been impressed with her "pure Afrikaner hospitality" when he visited her in 1995.

After her death, her house in Orania was converted into a museum. A primary school in Randfontein was previously named in her honour; it was later renamed Laerskool Westgold. A street in Goodwood, Cape Town retains her name.

References

External links

1901 births
2000 deaths
Afrikaner people
South African people of Danish descent
Spouses of prime ministers of South Africa
Stellenbosch University alumni
Orania, Northern Cape